Henrieta Nagyová won in the final 6–3, 5–7, 6–1 against Elena Wagner.

Seeds
A champion seed is indicated in bold text while text in italics indicates the round in which that seed was eliminated.

  Henrieta Nagyová (champion)
  Magdalena Grzybowska (withdrew)
  Virginia Ruano Pascual (withdrew)
  Sarah Pitkowski (second round)
  Gala León García (semifinals)
  Anna Smashnova (semifinals)
  Tatiana Panova (first round)
  Kristie Boogert (second round)
  Květa Hrdličková (quarterfinals)

Draw

External links
 1998 Prokom Polish Open Draw

Women's Singles
Singles
Prokom Polish Open - Singles, 1998